Qadamgah (also Romanized as Qadamgāh) is a city in Central District, in zeberkhan County, Razavi Khorasan Province, Iran. At the 2006 census, its population was 3,006, in 821 families.

Qadamgah is a Shia pilgrimage. It is historically part of the Greater Region of the city of Nishapur. It is now legally a separated county (shahrestan) though its people have daily commute and close ties and relatives with the main bigger city of Nishapur which is geographically close to it. Qadamgah used to be a part of the administrative county of Nishapur.

As a result of Imam al-Rida (a.s)'s travel from Medina to Merv, in which he crossed a major part of Iran, there are many qadamgahs attributed to him. The best known qadamgah attributed to the ali al rida (a.s) is the one in Nishapur which was constructed at the command of Shah 'Abbas in 1020/1611 over the relics of another building. It is widely believed that there is a human footprint on a black stone installed inside the building which is attributed to Imam al-Rida (a).

The majority of qadamgah attributed to Imam al-Rida (a.s) in Iran date back to the Safavid era. At least one-tenth of the 250 qadamgahs in Iran which are attributed to a prophet, an Imam, or a holy person are attributed to Imam al-Rida (a.s). The majority of qadamgahs attributed to him are located on his way from Medina to Merv (the so-called "Path of Wilaya").

However, there are qadamgahs attributed to him in other parts of Iran as well.

References 

Commons

Populated places in Nishapur County
Cities in Razavi Khorasan Province